is a Japanese professional footballer who played as an midfielder.

References

External links 
 

1994 births
Living people
Japanese footballers
Japanese expatriate footballers
Association football midfielders
Pietà Hotspurs F.C. players
Valmieras FK players
Persela Lamongan players
Maltese Premier League players
Latvian Higher League players
Liga 1 (Indonesia) players
Japanese expatriate sportspeople in Malta
Expatriate footballers in Malta
Japanese expatriate sportspeople in Latvia
Expatriate footballers in Latvia
Japanese expatriate sportspeople in Indonesia
Expatriate footballers in Indonesia